Qinghe may refer to:

Disaster
Qinghe Special Steel Corporation disaster, a disaster in Tieling, Liaoning

Locations in China

County-level subdivisions
Qinghe County, Hebei (清河县), Xingtai, Hebei
Qinggil County, or Qinghe County (青河县), in Altay Prefecture, Xinjiang
Qinghe District, Tieling (清河区), Liaoning
Qinghe District, Huai'an (清河区), Jiangsu

Subdistricts
Qinghe Subdistrict, Cao County (青菏街道), in Cao County, Shandong
Written as "清河街道":
Qinghe Subdistrict, Beijing, in Haidian District, Beijing
Qinghe Subdistrict, Fuyang, in Yingzhou District, Fuyang, Anhui
Qinghe Subdistrict, Changchun, in Chaoyang District, Changchun, Jilin
Qinghe Subdistrict, Fuxin, in Qinghemen District, Fuxin, Liaoning

Towns
Qinggil Town (青河镇), seat of Qinggil (Qinghe) County, Xinjiang
Written as "清河镇"
Qinghe, Tonghe County, Harbin, Heilongjiang
Qinghe, Ji'an, Jilin
Qinghe, Huimin County, Shandong
Qinghe, Yutai County, Shandong
Qinghe, Jishan County, Shanxi
Qinghe, Dazhu, Sichuan

Townships (清河乡)
Qinghe Township, Huaining County, Anhui
Qinghe Township, Nehe, Heilongjiang 
Qinghe Township, Tongjiang City, Heilongjiang
Qinghe Township, Fangcheng County, Henan
Qinghe Township, Zhongjiang County, Sichuan

Other
Qinghe Commandery (清河郡) in imperial China
Qing River (Beijing) (清河)
Qinghe railway station (清河站), Beijing
Qinghe Bridge in Deqing County, Zhejiang, China